Zoro may refer to:
Zoro (band), Japanese rock band
Zoro (drummer), American rock, R&B, and hip-hop drummer
Zoro (musician), Nigerian rapper, singer, and songwriter
Marco Zoro, football player from Ivory Coast
Roronoa Zoro, fictional character in One Piece

See also
Zorro (disambiguation)